Jackson Bennett (born January 5, 1996) is a professional Canadian football running back for the Ottawa Redblacks of the Canadian Football League (CFL). He played U Sports football with the Ottawa Gee-Gees from 2014 to 2017.

University career
Bennett played in 23 games for the Ottawa Gee-Gees in 2014, 2016, and 2017 as a defensive back and linebacker. Following shoulder surgery in August 2015, he sat out the 2015 season. Over those three seasons, he accumulated 89 solo tackles, 39 assisted tackles, one sack, and three interceptions, returning one for a touchdown. He was also featured on punt and kick returns, recording 40 kick returns for a 26.3-yard average with two touchdowns and 19 punt returns for a 10.0-yard average. In his final year with the Gee-Gees in 2017, he was named an OUA First Team All-Star on defence, an OUA Second Team All-Star on special teams, and was named the University of Ottawa Male Athlete of the year.

Professional career

Hamilton Tiger-Cats
Bennett was drafted as a defensive back in the second round, 11th overall by the Hamilton Tiger-Cats in the 2018 CFL Draft and signed with the team on May 20, 2018. He made the team following training camp and played in his first CFL game on June 16, 2018, against the Calgary Stampeders as a backup defensive back. In his first game, he returned three kickoffs for a 25.7-yard average. He recorded his first special teams tackle during the following game against the Edmonton Eskimos on June 22, 2018. He spent time on the injured list in 2018 and played in 11 games, recording eight special teams tackles. He earned his first career start, playing at the cover linebacker position, where he recorded three defensive tackles and one sack.

For the 2019 season, Bennett began training camp with the team's offence as a running back, a position that he had played in high school, indicating that the Tiger-Cats were planning on playing a Canadian there. He began the season as a backup running back and in the first game of the season, had three rushing attempts for -6 yards. He primarily played on special teams until injuries to Sean Thomas Erlington, Maleek Irons, and Cameron Marshall brought him into the spotlight for the Labour Day Classic against the Toronto Argonauts. In that game, he had 105 yards of total offence, with 12 carries for 77 yards and a touchdown and three catches for 28 yards. The 25-yard touchdown run was the first professional touchdown of his career and tied the game with the following convert proving to be the game-winning point.

Bennett signed a contract extension with the Tiger-Cats on December 29, 2020. However, he did not play in 2020 due to the cancellation of the 2020 CFL season. In 2021, he played in 13 regular season games, including one start at running back, where he had 17 carries for 72 yards and he also made four special teams tackles. He also played in all three post-season games, including the 108th Grey Cup, but the Tiger-Cats again lost to the Winnipeg Blue Bombers. He became a free agent upon the expiry of his contract on February 8, 2022.

Ottawa Redblacks
On February 8, 2022, it was announced that Bennett had signed with the Ottawa Redblacks. In his first season in Ottawa Bennett played in 14 games and carried the ball 50 times for 234 yards, he also caught 15 passes for 86 yards, returned eight kicks and recorded one special teams tackle. On December 14, 2022, Bennett and the Redblacks agreed to a contract extension.

Personal life
Bennett grew up in Ottawa and has two siblings, older sister Dria and younger brother Carter.

References

External links
 Ottawa Redblacks bio
 Gee-Gees bio

1996 births
Living people
Canadian football defensive backs
Canadian football running backs
Hamilton Tiger-Cats players
Ottawa Gee-Gees football players
Ottawa Redblacks players
Players of Canadian football from Ontario
Canadian football people from Ottawa